The Southern Department was a department of the government of the Kingdom of England and later the Kingdom of Great Britain from 1660 until 1782 when its functions were reorganised into the new Home Office and Foreign Office.

History
The department was initially established in 1660. It had a variety of responsibilities, including Irish policy, the Channel Islands, and foreign affairs concerning southern European powers such as France, Spain, Portugal, Switzerland, Italian states, Greece and the Ottoman Empire.   Colonial policy was also the responsibility of the Southern Department until 1768, at which time it was assigned to the newly created Secretary of State for the Colonies.  Domestic affairs in England and Wales were shared indifferently between the Southern and Northern Departments.  Scotland, which joined with England into the Kingdom of Great Britain after 1707, was at times represented by a separate Secretary of State for Scotland, though at others (1725–1741 and 1746–1782) it too was represented by the Northern and Southern Departments.

It was administered by the Secretary of State for the Southern Department. The Southern Department's opposite number within government was the Northern Department, responsible for government dealings in northern Europe. In 1782, the Northern and Southern Departments were reorganised, with the Foreign Office taking over their foreign affairs responsibilities and Home Office taking over their domestic, military affairs, and colonial responsibilities. (Military and colonial affairs were later transferred to a new offices).

See also
 Northern Department
 
 
 Secretary of State (England)

References

Bibliography

 

Defunct departments of the Government of the United Kingdom
.
Foreign relations of England
Foreign relations of Great Britain
Governance of England
Southern Department 01
Southern Department 01
Southern Department 01
Southern Department 01
Southern Department 01
Government agencies established in 1660
1660 establishments in England
1782 disestablishments in Great Britain
1660 establishments in the British Empire
1782 disestablishments in the British Empire